Michel Pinçon (18 May 1942 – 26 September 2022) was a French sociologist. Most of his work was written in collaboration with his wife, Monique Pinçon-Charlot, and devoted to the study of the upper middle class and social elites.

Biography
Pinçon was born in Lonny, Ardennes on 18 May 1942 into a working-class family. His father was a polisher in Nouzonville. In 1967, he married fellow sociology student Monique Charlot, with whom he had a son.

Throughout his career, Pinçon was interviewed multiple times on France Inter. His works focused on income inequality and the customs and habits of wealthy families. Through his publications, he explored an anthropology of the elite class in contemporary French society.

Pinçon and his wife retired in 2007 and published more concise works thanks to an ability to express themselves more freely while not employed. In 2012, he publicly supported Jean-Luc Mélenchon for President, a candidate of the Left Front. He later distanced himself from Mélenchon, calling him "a new Mitterrand".

Michel Pinçon died of Alzheimer's disease in Paris, on 26 September 2022, at the age of 80. National Secretary of the French Communist Party Fabien Roussel paid tribute to him, saying "I pay tribute to this fellow traveler, a great sociologist, who never ceased, with Monique, to decipher the relationship of domination in all its forms".

Works
Désarrois ouvriers, familles de métallurgistes dans les mutations industrielles et sociales (1987)

With Monique Pinçon-Charlot
Dans les beaux quartiers (1989)
La chasse à courre, ses rites et ses enjeux (1993)
Voyage en grande bourgeoisie (1997)
Grandes Fortunes. Dynasties familiales et formes de richesse en France (1998)
Sociologie de la bourgeoisie (2000)
Sociologie de Paris (2004)
Châteaux et Châtelains : Les siècles passent, le symbole demeure (2005)
Les Ghettos du gotha : comment la bourgeoisie défend ses espaces (2007)
Paris : quinze promenades sociologiques (2009)
Les millionnaires de la chance (2010)
 (2010)
Des sociologues sans qualités ? Pratiques de recherche et engagements (2011)
L'argent sans foi ni loi (2012)
Altergouvernement (2012)
La Violence des riches (2013)
 (2013)
Pourquoi les riches sont-ils de plus en plus riches et les pauvres de plus en plus pauvres ? (2014)
C'est quoi être riche ? Entretiens avec Emile (2015)
Tentative d'évasion (fiscale) (2015)
Les prédateurs au pouvoir. Main basse sur notre avenir (2017)
Panique dans le 16e ! : Une enquête sociologique et dessinée (2017)
Les Riches au tribunal : l'affaire Cahuzac et l'évasion fiscale (2018)
Le Président des ultra-riches : Chronique du mépris de classe dans la politique d’Emmanuel Macron (2019)
Notre vie chez les riches : mémoires d'un couple de sociologues (2021)

References

1942 births
2022 deaths 
Deaths from Alzheimer's disease 
Deaths from dementia in France
French sociologists
French socialists
Research directors of the French National Centre for Scientific Research
Paris 8 University Vincennes-Saint-Denis alumni
Chevaliers of the Légion d'honneur
People from Ardennes (department)